Strona is a comune (municipality) in the Province of Biella in the Italian region Piedmont, located about  northeast of Turin and about  northeast of Biella.

Strona borders the following municipalities: Casapinta, Cossato, Crosa, Mezzana Mortigliengo, Trivero, Valle Mosso, Valle San Nicolao.

Etymology
The name Strona should come from storn or strom, celtic roots for flowing waters or river.

Demographic evolution

References

See also 
 Strona di Mosso

Cities and towns in Piedmont